The men's 50 kilometres walk at the 2013 World Championships in Athletics was held at the Luzhniki Stadium and Moscow streets on 14 August.

From the start on home soil, Russians Mikhail Ryzhov and Ivan Noskov took the lead, with Jared Tallent in tow.  By 15K the three had broken away to a 12-second lead.  Tallent began to fall back to lead a large chasing pack as the two men continued to set the pace.  By the half way mark Grzegorz Sudol and Robert Heffernan, who had spotted the leaders 30 seconds earlier, joined world leader Yohann Diniz to form a 5-man pack at the front.  By 35K roles had reversed, Heffernan was now leading the Russians, Diniz was exiting the back and Sudol was trying to hold on.  Over the next 5K, Heffernan pushed the lead with Ryzhov, as Noskov and Sudol formed their own group now steadily losing ground.
Meanwhile, Tallent continued to hang around, leading the chase pack then leaving them behind to do a one-man chase of the leaders.
Heffernan finally broke Ryzhov and pushed his way to almost a minute victory.  Tallent continued his pace to finish third.  After giving up minutes to the leaders, Ihor Hlavan put in an impressive 21:38 final 5K to chase Tallent.

Records
Prior to the competition, the records were as follows:

Qualification standards

Schedule

Results

Final
The final was held at 08:30.

References

External links

50 kilometres walk results at IAAF website

50 kilometres walk
Racewalking at the World Athletics Championships